Cockatoo Station is situated on the Puffing Billy Railway in the town of the same name.
It opened with the line on 18 December 1900 as Devon, but was renamed Cockatoo Creek on 29 July 1901 and subsequently shortened to Cockatoo in 1904.  There was originally a platform road and a loop siding, but a crossing loop was later added in between the two.  A single 12ft by 20 ft timber portable station building was provided which was later extended.  Other associated buildings such as toilets and a van good shed were also on the platform while a weatherboard goods shed was provided on the loop siding (No. 3 Road).

Today, the loop siding has been provided again along with the platform track, but the crossing loop is yet to be rebuilt.  A platform exists which initially had a temporary non-heritage building provided for safeworking purposes only, but during 2007 a heritage type building, obtained second-hand from another Victorian station, was relocated to Cockatoo.  Although it is not representative of the original building, it nevertheless is a typical building of the day and now provides a more suitable safeworking office than the non-heritage building previously used for this purpose, which was subsequently removed in 2009.  Whilst trains normally stop at Cockatoo, very few passengers join or alight.

Plans to recreate all structures on the platform to their mid-1920s configuration are well advanced with a start to be made in the very near future.

Gallery

External links
 Melway map at street-directory.com.au

Tourist railway stations in Melbourne
Railway stations in the Shire of Cardinia